Kusur is a small village in Vaibhavwadi tehsil, Sindhudurg district, Maharashtra, India. The closest station to visit this place is Vaibhavwadi Station. Kusur in itself has 12 wadi's. Bazarwadi, Tembwadi, Malewadi, Khadakwadi, are some of the Prominent Wadis here.

Kusur is famous for its Temple (Jagrut Devasthan), Shri Rameshwar Darubai Mandir, located in Khadakwadi, Kusur. Every year, the entire village celebrates a festival at this temple called Waadiya which is held generally during late November or early December. 

The Grampanchayat Office is located in Bazarwadi, Kusur. The closest market here is the Bazarwadi while Vaibhavwadi station is a center to travel to other places. Mode of transport available here are the share trax or taxis from Vaibhavwadi station. The most prominent villagers here are the Patil's of Kusur. 

Villages in Sindhudurg district